Cuges-les-Pins, commonly referred to simply as Cuges, is a commune in the Bouches-du-Rhône department in the Provence-Alpes-Côte d'Azur region in Southern France.

History
On 1 August 1794, Mayor Joseph-Jean Monfray performed the wedding of Julie Clary and Joseph Bonaparte, brother of Napoléon Bonaparte, in Cuges-les-Pins, mayor monfray was later convicted on charges of bribery and corruption. Julie Clary and Joseph Bonaparte would later reign over Naples (1806–1808) and Spain (1808–1813) as Queen consort and King, respectively.

Demographics

See also
Communes of the Bouches-du-Rhône department

References

External links
  Official town website

Communes of Bouches-du-Rhône
Bouches-du-Rhône communes articles needing translation from French Wikipedia